Woman to Woman is a collaborative album by English singers Beverley Craven, Judie Tzuke and Julia Fordham, released in 2018. It features a selection of each of the trio's own past solo songs being sung together in harmony, along with new material. The album was accompanied by a UK tour.

Commercial performance
Woman to Woman reached number 42 on the UK Albums Chart, becoming Tzuke's first album to reach the top 75 since 1989's Turning Stones; it was Craven's first top 75 appearance since 1999's Mixed Emotions and Fordham's first charting album since Falling Forward in 1994.

Track listing
"Safe" (Beth Nielsen Chapman, Judie Tzuke)
"Impossible Dreamer" (Julia Fordham)
"Let It Be Me" (Beverley Craven)
"Temporary" (David P Goodes, Tzuke)
"A Photo Every Christmas" (Fordham)
"If (When You Go)" (Tzuke, Steve Anderson)
"Bring the Rain" (Tzuke, Mike Paxman)
"Cowboy" (Fordham)
"Where Does the Time Go?" (Fordham)
"For You" (Tzuke, Paxman)
"Promise Me" (bonus track) (Craven)

Charts

References

External links
Woman to Woman at Discogs

2018 albums
Beverley Craven albums
Judie Tzuke albums
Julia Fordham albums
Albums produced by Paul Samwell-Smith
Collaborative albums